Cherie Dimaline is an Indigenous Canadian writer from the Georgian Bay Métis Nation, a part of Métis Nation of Ontario. She has written a variety of award-winning novels and other acclaimed stories and articles.  She is most noted for her 2017 young adult novel The Marrow Thieves, which explores the continued colonial exploitation of Indigenous people.

In addition to The Marrow Thieves, Dimaline has won the award for Fiction Book of the Year at the Anskohk Aboriginal Literature Festival for her first novel, Red Rooms. She has since published the short stories "Seven Gifts for Cedar", the novel The Girl Who Grew a Galaxy, and the short story collection A Gentle Habit. She is the 2019 editor of Little Bird Stories (Volume IX), published by Invisible Publishing and featuring winners of the annual Little Bird Writing Contest run by Sarah Selecky Writing School.

She was founding editor of Muskrat Magazine, was named the Emerging Artist of the Year at the Ontario Premier's Awards for Excellence in Arts in 2014, and became the first Aboriginal writer in residence for the Toronto Public Library.

Her latest novel, Empire of Wild, was published in 2019.

Biography
Dimaline was originally a resident of a  Métis community in the Georgian Bay area. She now resides in the city of Toronto. Her childhood summers were spent back in her Métis community. During the time spent back home, Dimaline learned stories from her family that she was then able to pass onto her cousins. Her father is a magician, and growing up she worked for him as a magician's assistant. From then on, Dimaline worked a variety of jobs, being employed as a curator for a museum, high-level manager for an investment company, and a director of a women's resource center.

In addition to her own authorship, Dimaline has contributed to a variety of projects including the anthology Mitêwâcimowina: Indigenous Science Fiction and Speculative Storytelling published in 2016. Dimaline was also a columnist and editor for Chatelaine magazine in the early 2000s, writing a variety of articles for the magazine.

Dimalaine considers herself exclusively a Métis or Indigenous writer, saying "I would love to be recognized as a writer of Indigenous stories. I'm not a Canadian writer. This is what is now known as Canada; it means something different to and for me."

Community involvement
Dimaline has participated in numerous literary festivals, including Kingston WritersFest (2016), Toronto International Festival of Authors (2016, 2018, 2019), Ottawa Writers Festival (2017, 2018, 2019), and Wordfest Imaginairium (2019). She will also be a featured author at the Vancouver Writers Festival in 2020, as well as being the festival's inaugural Guest Curator.  

Dimaline is the founder and organizer of the annual Indigenous Writers' Gathering, as well as the founding editor of FNV Magazine and Muskrat Magazine, two Indigenous-focussed publications.

Books

Seven Gifts for Cedar (2010)
Red Rooms (2007)
The Girl Who Grew a Galaxy (2013)
A Gentle Habit (2015)
The Marrow Thieves (2017)
Empire of Wild (2019)
Little Bird Stories, Volume 9 (2019)
Hunting by Stars (2021)
VenCo (2023)
An Anthology of Monsters: How Story Saves Us from Our Anxiety (2023)
Tiger Lily and the Secret Treasure of Neverland (2023)

Awards
In 2014 Dimaline was named the Emerging Artist of the Year at the Ontario Premier's Awards for Excellence in the Arts.

The Marrow Thieves has earned Dimaline a number of literary awards; for an extensive list see, The Marrow Thieves, Awards. It won the Governor General's Award for English-language children's literature at the 2017 Governor General's Awards and the 2017 Kirkus Prize in the young adult literature category, and it was a finalist in the CBC's 2018 Canada Reads competition and the 2018 White Pine Award.  Notably, Dimaline's acceptance speech for the 2017 Governor General's Award for English Young Adult Fiction was delivered by her friend, the artist Susan Blight in Anishinaabemowin. Dimaline said about the event, "I wrote the speech and she [Blight] delivered it without translation…"  This was the first time an acceptance speech for the Governor General's Award had been delivered in a language other than English or French.  

Empire of Wild is Dimaline's newest novel.

Dimaline was the 2021 recipient of the Writers' Trust Engel/Findley Award.

Reception
The Marrow Thieves has been widely acclaimed for its portrayal of Indigenous colonization and ecological devastation. The book has been lauded for its ability to crossover from YA fiction to adult fiction, especially as it was defended by Jully Black as a finalist in the 2018 Canada Reads competition. Dimaline's novels have also been discussed in academia, notably by Niranjana Iyer and Petra Fachinger.

References

1975 births
21st-century Canadian novelists
21st-century Canadian short story writers
Canadian women novelists
Canadian women short story writers
Canadian science fiction writers
Canadian writers of young adult literature
Governor General's Award-winning children's writers
Métis writers
Writers from Toronto
Women science fiction and fantasy writers
Living people
21st-century Canadian women writers
Kirkus Prize winners